The Daily Collegian could refer to:
The Daily Collegian, the paper at Penn State University
The Massachusetts Daily Collegian, the student paper at the University of Massachusetts Amherst